Protactinium(IV) bromide is an inorganic compound. It is an actinide halide, composed of protactinium and bromine. It is radioactive, and has the chemical formula of PaBr4. It may be due to the brown color of bromine that causes the appearance of protactinium(IV) bromide to be brown crystals. Its crystal structure is tetragonal. Protactinium(IV) bromide is sublimed in a vacuum at 400 °C. The protactinium(IV) halide closest in structure to protactinium(IV) bromide is protactinium(IV) chloride.

Preparation 
Protactinium(IV) bromide can be prepared by reacting protactinium(V) bromide with hydrogen gas or aluminium:

Properties 
Protactinium(IV) bromide reacts with antimony trioxide to form protactinium bromate:

See also 
 Protactinium(V) bromide

References 

Bromides
Actinide halides
Protactinium compounds